John Caskie Collet (May 25, 1898 – December 5, 1955) was a United States circuit judge of the United States Court of Appeals for the Eighth Circuit and previously was a United States district judge of the United States District Court for the Eastern District of Missouri and the United States District Court for the Western District of Missouri.

Education and career

Born in Keytesville, Missouri, Collet was in the United States Army Air Corps from 1917 to 1918, and read law in 1920. He was city attorney of Salisbury, Missouri from 1922 to 1924, and then county prosecutor for Chariton County, Missouri from 1925 to 1929. He then served as assistant counsel to the Missouri State Highway Department from 1930 to 1933. He became Chairman of the Missouri Public Service Commission in 1933, and then became a Judge of the Missouri Supreme Court from 1935 to 1937.

Federal judicial service

Collet was nominated by President Franklin D. Roosevelt on March 9, 1937, to the United States District Court for the Eastern District of Missouri and the United States District Court for the Western District of Missouri, to a new joint seat authorized by 49 Stat. 1804. He was confirmed by the United States Senate on March 15, 1937, and received his commission on March 20, 1937. His service terminated on July 11, 1947, due to his elevation to the Eighth Circuit.

Collet was nominated by President Harry S. Truman on April 30, 1947, to a seat on the United States Court of Appeals for the Eighth Circuit vacated by Judge Kimbrough Stone. He was confirmed by the Senate on July 8, 1947, and received his commission on July 9, 1947. His service terminated on December 5, 1955, due to his death in Kansas City, Missouri.

References

Sources
 

1898 births
1955 deaths
Judges of the United States District Court for the Western District of Missouri
Judges of the United States District Court for the Eastern District of Missouri
United States district court judges appointed by Franklin D. Roosevelt
20th-century American judges
Judges of the United States Court of Appeals for the Eighth Circuit
United States court of appeals judges appointed by Harry S. Truman
United States Army Air Forces soldiers
United States federal judges admitted to the practice of law by reading law
People from Keytesville, Missouri
Judges of the Supreme Court of Missouri